Lamellariinae is a subfamily of small slug-like sea snails, marine gastropod molluscs belonging to the family Velutinidae, in the order Littorinimorpha.

Description
Species with internal shell, hidden beneath a papillate mantle with lateral flaps. These flaps are in some genera fused to enclose the shell. The thin shell is smooth and contains two to three whorls of which the body whorl is rapidly expanding into a large aperture. Some species have a thick, hairy periostracum. They resemble dorid nudibranches, but differ by their smooth tentacles and the absence of a dorsal gill circlet.

Most species are carnivores feeding mainly on ascidians, tunicates and cnidarians.

Genera
Genera in the subfamily Lamellariinae include:
Calyptoconcha Bouchet & Waren, 1993
 Coriocella Blainville, 1824
 Hainotis F. Riedel, 2000
Lamellaria Montagu, 1815
Mysticoncha Allan, 1936
 Pseudosacculus Hirase, 1928
 Genus Echinospira Krohn, 1853 (uncertain status)
Synonyms
 Chelinotus Swainson, 1840: synonym of Coriocella Blainville, 1824
 Chelyonotus Herrmannsen, 1846: synonym of Chelinotus Swainson, 1840: synonym of Coriocella Blainville, 1824 (unjustified emendation)
 Cryptocella H. Adams & A. Adams, 1853: synonym of Lamellaria Montagu, 1816 (junior objective synonym of Lamellaria)
 Djiboutia Vayssière, 1912: synonym of Lamellaria Montagu, 1816
 Marsenia Oken, 1823: synonym of Lamellaria Montagu, 1816
 Sacculus Hirase, 1927: synonym of Pseudosacculus Hirase, 1928 (non Gosse, 1851)

References 

 Troschel, F. H. (1848). Mollusca, Gastropoda. Pp. 536–568, in: A. F. A. Wiegmann & J. F. Ruthe, Handbuch der Zoologie, ed. 3. Lüderitz, Berlin. iv + 651 pp.

Further reading 
 Powell A. W. B., New Zealand Mollusca, William Collins Publishers Ltd, Auckland, New Zealand 1979 
 Thiele, J. (1929-1935). Handbuch der systematischen Weichtierkunde. Jena, Gustav Fischer, 1154 pp. Vol. 1 part 1: 1-376
 Bouchet P., Rocroi J.P., Hausdorf B., Kaim A., Kano Y., Nützel A., Parkhaev P., Schrödl M. & Strong E.E. (2017). Revised classification, nomenclator and typification of gastropod and monoplacophoran families. Malacologia. 61(1-2): 1-526.

External links 
 
 Orbigny, A. d'. (1841-1853). Mollusques. In: R. de la Sagra (ed.). Histoire physique, politique et naturelle de l'Ile de Cuba. Arthus Bertrand, Paris. Vol 1: 1-264
 Gray, J. E. (1847). On the classification of the British Mollusca by W E Leach. Annals and Magazine of Natural History. (1) 20: 267-273
 https://doi.org/10.18941/venusomsj.4.1_44; https://doi.org/10.18941/venusomsj.4.3_184; https://doi.org/10.18941/venusomsj.4.4_258; https://doi.org/10.18941/venusomsj.4.5_319; https://doi.org/10.18941/venusomsj.5 Kuroda T. (1932-1935). A list of genera of Japanese Mollusca. Parts 1-6. Venus. 3(5): 282-289

Velutinidae